Black Light is a science fiction thriller that ran in the British comic anthology 2000 AD in 1996. It was created by Dan Abnett, Steve White and John M. Burns.

It chronicles the missions undertaken by an elite unit appointed by the US president to investigate and shut down black ops by rogue government agencies. The series was developed to capitalise on the popularity of The X-Files and Mission: Impossible. The influence of The X-Files in particular can be seen in the subject of government conspiracies and the involvement of mysterious men in black. The men in black in Black Light very closely resemble the men in black that act as hosts of the similarly X-Files-inspired Vector 13.

It was almost adapted as a television pilot by Francis Ford Coppola’s production company.

Plot
In “Survivor Syndrome” the Black Light team try to prevent a plot to assassinate the US president in London. In the end the president's life is saved and Black Light discover that the Gulf War actually ended in a cover-up of a failed American bioweapon experiment and the propping up of Saddam Hussein. The bioweapon is also revealed to be responsible for the necrotising fasciitis affecting Emma Paris's face. On the mission the team leader Wade Powers is killed, Emma Paris is put in charge and a former United States Secret Service agent, Mark Bogard is appointed to the team.

In “Lords of Creation” an informant reveals secrets about super soldier experiments using nanorobotics on a military base. When the Black Light team investigate they discover the dangerous destabilising effect of the technology and manage to stop a water reservoir from being infected. Wiseman, however, is infected.

In “Pandora’s Box” a global nuclear conspiracy is exposed when Black Light foil an attempt by activists to stop bombing in the Pacific Ocean. At the end the man in black reveals to Emma Paris that the bombing is a method of containing an infernal force brought forth during nuclear tests in the 1950s.

Publications
 “Survivor Syndrome” (art by John M. Burns, in 2000 AD, #1001-1005, reprinted in Judge Dredd Megazine, #336, 2013)
 “Lords of Creation” (art by Lee Sullivan, in 2000 AD, #1006-1009, reprinted in Judge Dredd Megazine, #336, 2013)
 “Pandora’s Box” (art by Steve Yeowell, in 2000 AD, #1010-1013, reprinted in Judge Dredd Megazine, #337, 2013)

References

2000 AD comic strips
Comics by Dan Abnett